Eslamabad (also Romanized as Eslāmābād) is a village in Barik Rud Rural District, in the Central District of Fereydunkenar County, Mazandaran Province, Iran. At the 2006 census, its population was 381, in 104 families.

References 

Populated places in Fereydunkenar County